Klaus Florian Vogt (born 12 April 1970) is a German operatic tenor known for his reedy voice and for singing roles written by Richard Wagner.

Career 
Klaus Florian Vogt was a hornist first and played for several years with the Hamburg Philharmonic. He studied voice at the Lübeck Academy of Music and was first engaged at the Landestheater in Flensburg.

In 1998 he moved to the Semperoper in Dresden, where he worked with Giuseppe Sinopoli and Colin Davis. He started as a lyrical tenor, singing Tamino in Mozart's Die Zauberflöte, then also Hans in Smetana's The Bartered Bride and Matteo in Strauss' Arabella.

He sang Wagner's Lohengrin first at the Theater Erfurt in 2002, followed by international appearances in this part and also as Stolzing in Die Meistersinger von Nürnberg, his debut part at the Bayreuther Festspiele in 2007, and Parsifal.

In the concert repertoire, he recorded Mahler's Das Lied von der Erde, with Christian Gerhaher and the Orchestre symphonique de Montréal, conducted by Kent Nagano in 2009.

References

External links 

 
 
 Klaus Florian Vogt on his agent's website, including a list of his opera parts (in German)
 Entries for recordings by Klaus Florian Vogt on WorldCat
 

1970 births
Living people
People from Heide
German operatic tenors
20th-century German  male opera singers
21st-century German  male opera singers